Jessica Harris may refer to:

 Jessica Harris (actress) (born 1981), British actress
 Jessica Harris (Hollyoaks), a fictional character in British soap opera Hollyoaks
 Jessica B. Harris (born 1948), American food historian
 Jessica Harris, producer and host of NPR podcast From Scratch (radio)